Pristimantis avicuporum is a species of frog in the family Strabomantidae. It is endemic to Peru where it is only known from the region of its type locality near La Peca, Bagua Province, in the Amazonas Region of northern Peru.
Its natural habitat humid montane forests.

References

avicuporum
Endemic fauna of Peru
Amphibians of Peru
Frogs of South America
Amphibians described in 1999
Taxonomy articles created by Polbot